Four group or Group of Four may refer to:

Klein four-group
Four note group
G4 nations
Lucky Four Group
Clause Four Group

See also 
 Gang of Four (disambiguation)